Huddersfield Town's 1920–21 campaign was Town's first season in the Football League First Division. It was more a baptism of fire than a season of success. They finished in 17th place, after scoring only 42 goals in the league and no player getting into double figures.

One notable thing from this season was the appointment of Herbert Chapman as manager in March, as his vision would lead Town to great success in the rest of the decade.

Squad at the start of the season

Review
After the previous season's successes in both Division 2 and FA Cup, many were wondering how Ambrose Langley's team would get on in the top-flight. After winning 5 of their first 6 games, Town were in line for a possible chance at the title, however the next 26 league games would only produce 3 more wins, which saw Town in the middle of a relegation battle.

Earlier in the season, a Mr. Herbert Chapman was brought in as the new club secretary and at the end of March, he replaced Langley as manager and in 4 of his 7 games, Town recorded the necessary wins which pulled Town out of any danger of relegation.

Squad at the end of the season

Results

Division One

FA Cup

Appearances and goals

Huddersfield Town A.F.C. seasons
Huddersfield Town F.C.